This is an incomplete 2004 to 2007 list of episodes of Taiwanese entertainment news / variety show 100% Entertainment. It is broadcast on  Gala Television (GTV) Variety Show/CH 28 from Monday to Sunday. It is currently hosted by Show Lo and Alien Huang. There is usually one or two days in a week that it is broadcast live from the recording studio, on entertainment news sometimes with guests in attendance; the other days are pre-recorded variety specials and Sundays are compilation shows.

On the programme Show and Alien are usually introduced and credited by their nicknames: Xiao Zhu (小豬) and Xiao Gui (小鬼) respectively.

 List of 100% Entertainment episodes: 2004 to 2007  2008  2009  2010 2011  2012

2004

2005

2006

2007

References

Taiwanese variety shows
Lists of Taiwanese television series episodes